Bepi Colombo may refer to:

 Giuseppe 'Bepi' Colombo (1920–1984), an Italian scientist
 10387 Bepicolombo, an asteroid named after Bepi Colombo
 BepiColombo, a space mission to Mercury, named after Bepi Colombo